The Royal Spanish Handball Federation (RFEBM) is the national handball association in Spain.

The Royal Spanish Handball Federation is a member of the European Handball Federation (EHF) and the International Handball Federation (IHF).

The organisation is responsible for the Spain men's national handball team, the Spain women's national handball team, and the Spain national beach handball team. As of May 2019, the federation has 924 registered clubs and 99,185 federated players.

Honours

National team

National youth teams

Presidents

References

External links 
Official Site 

Handball in Spain
Handball
Spain
Organisations based in Spain with royal patronage